Pictures of Old Days is the second and final studio album by the Italian Italo disco band Scotch. It was released in 1987.

Track listing

Personnel 

Scotch

 Vince Lancini – lead and backing vocals
 Fabio Margutti – keyboards, piano
 Franz Rome – keyboards

Additional musicians

 Marcello Merlini – background vocals on "Plus Plus"

Production

 David Zambelli – producer
 Walter Zambelli – producer
 Massimo Noè – engineer, mixing

Artwork

 R. Monachesi – design

Charts

References

External links 

 

1987 albums
Scotch (band) albums
ZYX Music albums